Phasmomantis sumichrasti is a species of mantis of the family Mantidae.

Range
It is found in Honduras, Mexico, and the United States (Texas),

See also
List of mantis genera and species

References

External links
 Photos of Phasmomantis sumichrasti UKmantisforums.co.uk

Stagmomantinae
Mantodea of North America
Insects of Central America
Insects of Mexico
Insects of the United States
Insects described in 1861